Stephen G. Fogarty is a retired United States Army lieutenant general who last served as the Commanding General of the United States Army Cyber Command from 2018 to 2022. Previously, he served as the Chief of Staff of the United States Cyber Command.

References

Living people
Place of birth missing (living people)
Recipients of the Defense Superior Service Medal
Recipients of the Distinguished Service Medal (US Army)
Recipients of the Legion of Merit
United States Army generals
United States Army personnel of the War in Afghanistan (2001–2021)
Year of birth missing (living people)